The Krka Monastery is a Serbian Orthodox monastery dedicated to the Archangel Michael, located near the river Krka,  east of Kistanje, in central Dalmatia, Croatia. It is the best known monastery of the Serbian Orthodox Church in Croatia and it is officially protected as part of the Krka National Park. It was established around 1577 or later on the ground of previous Gothic-Romanesque style Catholic church.

History 
The monastery was built on top of a Ancient Rome site, Roman burial catacombs, Romanesque belfry, Gothic window and other parts of the building (including three graves), show that the Orthodox monastery was previously home to a late medieval Catholic church or monastery, as the style was uncommon in other Serbian Orthodox churches of the time.

According to the common folk story about its foundation, claimed by the Serb Orthodox eparchy's clergy, it was founded in 1345 or 1350 when it is listed as an endowment of Serbian princess Jelena Nemanjić Šubić, half-sister of the Serbian emperor Dušan and wife of Mladen III Šubić Bribirski (not Mladen the II), Croatian duke of Skradin and Bribir. However, the claim is a baseless late 19th century forgery, made up and published by Serb Othodox Bishop of Dalmatia Nikodim Milaš in his article Iz prošlosti pravoslavne crkve u Dalmaciji (From the history of Orthodox Church in Dalmatia, 1900) and Pravoslavna Dalmacija (Orthodox Dalmatia, 1901), in which, popular to the period and related to Greater Serbia ideology, were forged various claims about pre-Ottoman presence of Serbs in Dalmatia.

In no previous official Serb Orthodox schematism such a claim can be found and in all there is a conclusion that there is no historical information about the foundation. Neither both Croatian and Serbian historians and archaeologists of the epoch mention such a claim. Until today the forgery became so strongly accepted that it is considered almost as a fact in Serbian historiography. As archaeological forgery was also confirmed an epigraphic inscription with supposed date of 1402 written in Arabic alphabet or Arabic numbers and dating which is uncommon for Greek-East Orthodox style, showing originally instead 1702 related to protopop Lazo Lazarićević, and that the fabrication was made by archimandrite Jerotije Kovačević in 1859; and alleged inscription from 1422 which should be originally dated to 1782.

The earliest source of Christian monastery would be from 1458 by dragoman Cosmo Calavri Imberti, in which is mentioned certain monk Pahomije (lat. Pachomius). According to the document by Gavrilo Avramović in 1578, seemingly it was independent from the metropolitan seat under Serbian Patriarchate of Peć. According to some sources, including monastery engravings, the Orthodox monastery was possibly founded ten years earlier, in 1577, but Ottoman census in 1550 already show existence of the Church of St. Michael, while according to others can be only certainly dated since mid-17th century. During the War of Candia, in mid-17th century immigrated Orthodox population led by vladika Stefanović and other fifteen priests who settled in the monastery of Krka.

According to mid-17th century documents, during Venetian-Ottoman war, some monks, declared as Croats and Catholics who "live in the service of the Greek Church of the old Illyrian or Croatian language", fled from the Ottomans and found shelter in Zadar, where pope Innocent X in 1655 gave them two churches, that had previously been in possession of Franciscans of the Third Order, named "Glagolitians". It is also claimed that the supposed Orthodox monks who fled founded Gomirje monastery in Gorski kotar, leaving Krka monastery abandoned for a long time until it was rebuilt in around 1787 by archimandrite Nikador Bogunović. But, according to Mate Marčinko, such a claim also seems a forgery and contradiction, as no Serb Orthodox monk lived there hence could flee to Zadar and elsewhere, and Serb Orthodox people and clergy migrated to those Ottoman occupied lands thanks to their collaboration with the Ottoman service.

It is considered to have been looted in 1674. Other monastery buildings from 18th–19th century, the church, and the belfry are situated around a rectangular cloister with arcades.

From the 1960s the monastery was a place of annual gathering by local Serbs and Croats, but in August 1989, after the Gazimestan speech, arrived many from Serbia promoting Serbian national claims, later followed by formation of SAO Krajina and Croatian War of Independence. After Operation Storm in 1995 the monastery was looted, but not significantly, as it was protected by the Croatian authorities (police), abandoned, and the seminary shut down and relocated to Divčibare and, later, Foča. The monks returned in 1999, and the seminary reopened in 2001.

Architectural features 

The belltower of this monastery was built in the Romanesque style. The complex also includes a chapel of Saint Sava built in the 19th century, under the tutelage of the Serbian Orthodox Bishop of Dalmatia Stefan Knežević, as well as a new building of the seminary and an additional dormitory building. The monastery has its archives and a library with a variety of ancient books and valuable items from the 14th to the 20th century, a collection of icons from the 15th and 18th century, silverware, embroideries and else, but a good part of it was moved in the 1990s to Serbia.

See also 
 List of Serb Orthodox Monasteries
 Serbs of Croatia

References 

Literature

 
 Japundžić, Marko: Tragom hrvatskoga glagolizma, KS, Zagreb, 1995., p. 51-54, 978-953-151-060-1

External links 

 Website of the Monastery (in English)

Serbian Orthodox monasteries in Croatia
Buildings and structures in Šibenik-Knin County
Romanesque architecture in Croatia
Fortified church buildings
16th-century Serbian Orthodox church buildings
Medieval sites in Croatia